ALPLA, otherwise ALPLA Group is an Austrian, international acting plastics manufacturer and plastics recycler headquartered in Hard, specialising in blow-moulded bottles and caps, injection-moulded parts, preforms and tubes. It is one of the largest producers of rigid plastic packaging solutions worldwide, with a total of 190 production plants in 46 countries worldwide, approx. 23,300 employees and annual sales of € 5.10 billion in 2022. In early 2021, the ALPLA Group announced that it would invest an average of 50 million euros a year until 2025 in the ongoing expansion of its recycling activities.

History 

The company was founded in 1955 as "Alpenplastik Lehner Alwin OHG" and is today the employer of around 23,300 people in 46 countries worldwide (around 1,120 of them in Vorarlberg, Austria).

The headquarter of the company is in Hard, Austria. ALPLA is building their plants all over the world close to the customers filling plant or even inside the customers building (called: Inhouse Plants). 68 plants of Alpla were built next to the customers filling system.

References 

Manufacturing companies of Austria
Plastics companies of Austria
Economy of Vorarlberg